(1 December 1910 – 15 August 1945) was a Lieutenant Colonel in the Imperial Japanese Army during World War II. He was brother-in-law to General Takeshi Mori, commander of the First Imperial Guards Division, in charge of defending Tokyo and the surrounding region.

Very early on the morning of 15 August 1945, Shiraishi was in his brother-in-law's office when Mori was visited by Major Kenji Hatanaka, Lt. Colonels Jiro Shiizaki and Masataka Ida, and Captain Shigetaro Uehara, who sought Mori's aid in a coup.  They wished to seize the Imperial Palace and prevent the Emperor's declaration of Japan's surrender. Mori refused the conspirators, and Uehara allegedly made to kill the General with his sword; Shiraishi leapt in front of his brother-in-law, and was killed himself. Mere moments later, Hatanaka murdered General Mori.

References
Brooks, Lester. Behind Japan's Surrender: The Secret Struggle That Ended an Empire. New York: McGraw-Hill Book Company, 1968.

1910 births
1945 deaths
Imperial Japanese Army personnel of World War II
People murdered in Japan
Imperial Japanese Army officers
Japanese military personnel killed in World War II
Deaths by stabbing in Japan
Japanese murder victims